"Deep, Deep Trouble" is a rap song from the 1990 Simpsons album The Simpsons Sing the Blues, performed by the fictional character Bart Simpson (voiced by Nancy Cartwright) about his trouble-making antics. It was written by Matt Groening and DJ Jazzy Jeff and recorded in September 1990.

The song was released as the second single from the album in early 1991 and an accompanying music video (directed by Gregg Vanzo) was broadcast on television on March 7, 1991. This video has since been released on DVD as part of the 2002 boxset The Simpsons: The Complete Second Season.

"Deep, Deep Trouble" charted in several countries around the world, including the top ten in Ireland, New Zealand, and the United Kingdom. Critical reception of the song was positive, with its humorous lyrics and Cartwright's performance being singled out for praise.

Background
"Deep, Deep Trouble" appeared on the successful 1990 album The Simpsons Sing the Blues that features songs sung by the characters from the American animated television series The Simpsons. It was recorded along with the rest of the album during late 1990, at which point the cast members of The Simpsons were also recording the second season of the series. The song was written by The Simpsons creator Matt Groening and DJ Jazzy Jeff, and produced by DJ Jazzy Jeff and John Boylan. DJ Jazzy Jeff provided the drum programming, keyboards, and scratches on "Deep, Deep Trouble".

The song is a rap performed by the character Bart Simpson about his trouble-making antics. Groening has described it as "the tragic story of Bart Simpson, a bad youth gone worse." The Simpsons cast member Nancy Cartwright, who voices Bart on the show, provided the character's voice in "Deep, Deep Trouble" as well. The characters Homer Simpson and Maggie Simpson are also featured, with Homer (voiced by Dan Castellaneta like on the show) ranting at Bart, and Maggie sucking on her pacifier to the beat of the song.

"Deep, Deep Trouble" was released in early 1991 as the second single from The Simpsons Sing the Blues after "Do the Bartman", which also features Bart rapping. That single achieved much popularity, placing first on the singles charts in Australia, Ireland, New Zealand, Norway, and the United Kingdom, and eventually becoming certified gold in the latter country with 400,000 units sold. In Ireland, "Do the Bartman" spent nine weeks at number one on the Irish Singles Chart—only seven singles have ever managed a longer run at number one there.

Reception

The song received a positive response from critics. Sommer Swindell of the Observer-Reporter commented that "after listening to [The Simpsons Sing the Blues] once, no one will forget 'Deep, Deep Trouble' [...] It would be hard not to crack a smile while listening closely to the lyrics, as they are very creative and humorous." Thor Christensen of The Milwaukee Journal wrote that Bart "gets in a few good yuks" in the song, and Walt Belcher of The Tampa Tribune reported that Bart "raps out an amusing story about his misadventures while mowing the lawn". The Orange County Registers Cary Darling noted that "Bart turning his life into a hip-hop autobiography on 'Deep, Deep Trouble' is an absolute joy." Cartwright's rapping was praised by Tom Hopkins of the Dayton Daily News.

Commercially, the single was not as successful as "Do the Bartman", but it still charted high in a few countries, reaching number one in Ireland, the top 10 in the UK and New Zealand, and the top 20 in Sweden.

Music video
The music video for the single premiered on the Fox network in the United States on March 7, 1991, together with the Simpsons episode "Bart's Dog Gets an "F" of the series' second season. When "Do the Bartman" was released it was also accompanied by a music video, which ended up being nominated for Best Special Effects at the 1991 MTV Video Music Awards and becoming the number one music video on the American network MTV. The version of the song used in the video is an edit, containing fewer lyrics than the album version.

The video for "Deep, Deep Trouble", starting with Bart being shoved into what appears to be a jail cell, illustrates in flashback the things Bart raps about in the song, showing how he is forced by Homer to mow the lawn after throwing a buzzing alarm clock at his father in his sleep. When Homer tells Bart to hurry up, Bart accidentally runs over the sprinkler and as a result he has to stay at home when the family goes to see a boat show. After they leave, Bart decides to throw a party and invites his friends. They make a mess in the house and when Homer and Marge return home, Bart realizes he is in deep trouble. Homer later takes Bart to the barber, where his hair is shaved off. Joanne Ostrow of The Denver Post thought the video was not "nearly as clever as the cartoon" and that it had "'promotional gimmick' written all over it." "Then again, I never thought the video of the dance rap 'Do the Bartman' would be a ratings hit when it aired in December. So what do I know?" she added.

The music video features both original animation and old animation from the series and the Simpsons shorts that aired on The Tracey Ullman Show before they were spun off into The Simpsons in 1989. Gregg Vanzo directed the video, which, according to him, features quicker character poses than in episodes of the show to allow the animation to match the hip-hop beat. The music video was later included on the 2002 DVD boxset The Simpsons: The Complete Second Season, with audio commentary from its producers.

Track listing
US maxi-single CD 
 "Deep, Deep Trouble" (Dance Mix Edit) (remixed by DJ Jazzy Jeff)  – 4:13
 "Deep, Deep Trouble" (Full Dance Mix) (remixed by DJ Jazzy Jeff)  – 5:50
 "Deep, Deep Trouble" (LP Version) – 4:28
 "Sibling Rivalry" (LP Version) – 4:40

Charts

Weekly charts

Year-end charts

References

1991 singles
1990 songs
American hip hop songs
Geffen Records singles
Irish Singles Chart number-one singles
The Simpsons songs
Songs written by DJ Jazzy Jeff